Mahagama Sekera (Mahagamage Samaraekara) (Sinhala:මහගම සේකර / මහගමගේ සේකර ) (7 April 1929 – 14 January 1976) was a famed Sri Lankan poet, lyricist, playwright, novelist, artist, translator and filmmaker. He is considered to be a groundbreaking figure in Sinhalese poetry and literature. He is best remembered as a poet and songwriter with several of his works even becoming popular songs in Sri Lanka. His works occasionally have an introspective Buddhist-influenced outlook. His poems and songs remain widely quoted on the island nearly thirty years after his death.

Early life and education 
Mahagama Sekera was born on 7 April 1929 in Radawana, Colombo. His father was Maha Gamage John Singho, mother was Ranawaka Arachchige Roslin Ranawaka. He had his initial education at Government School in  Radawana and Kirindiwela Maha Vidayalaya. Sekera started life as an artist and in his later paintings and book covers he tended towards modern art. He got a thorough grounding in the forms and techniques of formal art at the Government School of Fine Arts of which he later became the Principal. Thus at a young age he was exposed to new ways of looking at the world and perceiving reality which combined with the folk culture of his inheritance in a typical village milieu gave its particular strength to his world view.

Sekera started his doctoral studies at Vidyodaya University of Ceylon in 1974. His thesis on "Sinhala Gadya Padya Nirmana Kerehi Ridmaya Balapa Athi Akaraya" (Influence of Rhythm on the Sinhala Prose and Poetry) was submitted to the university in 1975. At the time of his death in 1976, he was attending to the final editing of the thesis as recommended by the supervisors.
He was appointed to Gampaha Bandaranayaka School as a teacher.He worked for few months at school

Bibliography
Mahagama Sekera started his artistic and creative career as a painter. He contributed to every branch of literature. He wrote short essays and plays to sinhala weekly papers and magazines, published several novels and poetry, and wrote over 100 songs. Many of his songs were vocalised and music directed by Pandit W. D. Amaradeva. He wrote and produced the musical play Swarnathilaka, which was critically acclaimed.

Poetry
Vyanga (with K. Jayatillake)
Sakwa Lihini
Heta Irak Payai
Mak Nisada Yath
Rajathilaka Lionel saha Priyantha
Bodima
Nomiyemi
Prabudda

Novels
Thun Man Handiya
Mrano Mandira
Nomiyemi

Short stories
Peethara
Man Thananno
Puthata Karekak
Pungna
Meeya

Films
Thun Man Handiya

Plays
List of plays written by Sekera
Swarnathilaka 
Daskon
Kundalakesi 
Kantharaya
Chora Pabbatha 
Vidura
Sora Pawwa 
Sasa Jathakaya
Hansa Geethaya 
Nava Baga Sanda
Saddhantha 
Sabba Nadee Vankagatha
Amaraneeyathvaya 
Mudu Puttu (with Gunasena Galappatthi)

Notable songs written by Sekera 
 Sandakath Pini Diya -   Music Composer Lionel Algama & Vocalist Dr Pandith W.D. Amaradeva from Sinhala movie Parasathu Mal
 Me Sinhala Apage Ratayi – Nanda Malini, music composer Pandit W. D. Amaradeva, from Sinhala film Saravita
 Sannaliyane – W. D. Amaradeva, music composer Pandit W. D. Amaradeva
 Seethala Diya Piri Sunila Vilai – Sunil Edirisinghe, music composer Dr. Rohana Weerasinghe
 Adawan Desin – Victor Ratnayake, music composer Somadasa Alvitigala, from Sinhala film Wes Gaththo
 Wakkada langa -w.d amaradeva
 Rathnadeepa Janmabhoomi
 Ase Mathuwena Kandulu Bindu Gena  -W.D Amaradeva
 Siri Lanka Ratama Api
 "Mage deshaya awadhi karanu mena piyanani", a translation into Sinhala of the patriotic Rabindranath Tagore poem "Chitto Jetha Bhayshunyo"
 Etha Kandukara Himaw Arane - W. D. Amaradeva, music composer Lionel Algama
 Anna Balan Sanda - Edward Jayakody
 Dathe Karagata Simba Sanasannata - W. D. Amaradeva, Wimala Amaradewa

Awards
 1956 – Dina Dina Award for the painting Mahabinishkramana at the Annual Art Exhibition organised by the Jathika Kala Peramuna.
 1965 – Merit Award for the Best Lyricist at the Film Festival of Lanka Industrial Exhibition for the song "Atha Gavu Ganan Durin" in Sinhala film Gatavarayo.
 1968 – Award for the Best Lyric Writer for the song "Sinidu Sudu Mudu Thalave" composed for the film Sath Samudura (Directed by Dr Siri Gunasinghe) at the Sarasaviya Film Festival.
 1970 – Receives the award for the Best Lyricist for his song "Ratakin Ratakata" in the Sinhala film Binaramalie at the Sarasaviya Film Festival.
 1970 – Mahagama Sekera's film Thun Man Handiya receives the Friendship Award from Rajaye Lipikaru Seva Sangamaya.
 1971 – Thun Man Handiya wins him the award for the Most Promising Director at the Awards Festival of the Film Critics and Journalists of Ceylon in 1970 – 1971.
 1972 – Receives the Hela Vidu Saviya Kumaratunga Memorial Award for his Patriotic Songs.

See also
W.D. Amaradeva
Sandakath Pini Diya

References

External links
Mahagama Sekara
Mahagama Sekera Official Website
Laudatory essay
Lanka library

1929 births
1976 deaths
Sri Lankan poets
Sri Lankan lyricists
Sri Lankan songwriters
Sri Lankan Buddhists
Sinhalese writers
20th-century poets